"By the Time I Get to Phoenix" is a 1967 single by Glen Campbell.

By the Time I Get to Phoenix may also refer to:
By the Time I Get to Phoenix (Glen Campbell album), 1967
By the Time I Get to Phoenix (Injury Reserve album), 2021
By the Time I Get to Phoenix (Marty Robbins album), 1968